The 2021–22 Supercopa de España Femenina was the third edition of the current Supercopa de España Femenina, an annual women's football competition for clubs in the Spanish football league system that were successful in its major competitions in the preceding season.

Barcelona won the tournament for their second Supercopa title.

Draw 
The draw for the competition was held on 7 January 2022. The Final took place at La Ciudad del Fútbol in Las Rozas de Madrid on 23 January 2022.

Qualification 
The competition featured both finalists of the 2020–21 Copa de la Reina, as well as the next two highest-ranked clubs at the 2020–21 Primera División that had not already qualified through the cup final.

Qualified teams 
The following four teams qualified for the tournament.

Matches

Bracket

Semi-finals

Final

Notes

See also 
 2021–22 Primera División
 2021–22 Copa de la Reina

References 

2021–22 in Spanish football cups
2021